Abolghasem Orouji (born 2 December 1989) is an Iranian professional futsal player. He is currently a member of Giti Pasand in the Iranian Futsal Super League.

Honours

Country 
 AFC Futsal Championship
 Champion (1): 2018
 Asian Indoor and Martial Arts Games
 Champion (1): 2017

Club 
 AFC Futsal Club Championship
 Champion (2):  2015 (Tasisat Daryaei), 2018 (Mes Sungun)
 Runner-Up (2): 2017 (Giti Pasand), 2019 (Mes Sungun)
 Iranian Futsal Super League
 Champion (2): 2015–16 (Tasisat Daryaei), 2018–19 (Mes Sungun)
 Runners-up (2): 2012–13 (Saba), 2017–18 (Tasisat Daryaei)
 Iranian Futsal Hazfi Cup
 Champion (1): 2013–14 (Mahan Tandis)

References 

1989 births
Living people
People from Qom
Iranian men's futsal players
Futsal forwards
Almas Shahr Qom FSC players
Tasisat Daryaei FSC players
Giti Pasand FSC players
Mes Sungun FSC players
Iranian expatriate futsal players
Iranian sportspeople in doping cases
21st-century Iranian people